VIP Brother 6, also known as VIP Brother: Образцов дом (lit. Model House) was the sixth season of the reality show VIP Brother in Bulgaria and the thirteenth season of the Big Brother format overall. The promo for the new season began airing on Nova Television on July 25, 2014. The show commenced on September 15, 2014. Niki Kanchev and Aleksandra Sarchadjieva returned as main presenters.

This season was reminiscent to the 1944-1989 communist rule in Bulgaria. It marked 70 years since 9 September 1944, 25 years since the fall of communism in Bulgaria on 10 November 1989, 30 years from George Orwell's 1984, on which the Big Brother format was based on, as well as 10 years since the premiere of the Big Brother format in Bulgaria in 2004. Vladislav Karamfilov "Vladi Vargala" won with Yordanka Hristova as the runner-up.

Housemates
15 Housemates entered the House on Day 1. They were joined by 3 other Housemates on Day 3.

Albena 
Albena Vuleva is a Bulgarian TV host who became famous in 2002 when she first started the controversial tabloid TV show Singalno zhalto (Yellow signal in English) on the cable channel Skat, making insulting comments about various celebrities. Her father is Bulgarian and her mother is Russian. She was born in Saint Petersburg, Russia. She entered the House on Day 1 and finished fifth in the finale on Day 64.

Atanas 
Atanas Mesechkov is a dancer and choreograph in Dancing Stars. He entered the House on Day 1 and was the sixth evicted on Day 57.

Elena 
Elena Kuchkova "Kuchkata" is a former participant of the Bulgarian version of Playboy Playmate, Miss Playmate 2013 Bulgaria. She entered the House on Day 1 and finished sixth in the finale on Day 64.

Eleonora 
Eleonora Gigova "Eli" is a TV host and daughter of the owner of PFC Lokomotiv Sofia Nikolay Gigov. She entered the House on Day 1 and was the ninth evicted on Day 59.

Evgeni 
Evgeni Minchev is a famous Bulgarian gay man involved in Bulgarian highlife PR. He entered the House on Day 1 and was the second evicted on Day 29.

Evgenia 
Evgenia Kalkandzieva "Jeni" is a model and former Miss Bulgaria 1995. She also finished in sixth place on the Miss World 1995 pageant, which is so far the best result for any Bulgarian participant. She entered the House on Day 1 with her husband Stefan M. and finished fourth in the finale on Day 64.

Galina 
Galina Ivanova "Kali" is a pop-folk singer. She entered the House on Day 1 and was the tenth evicted on Day 61.

Iva 
Iva Ekimova is a TV host. She entered the House on Day 1 and was the third evicted on Day 36.

Ivo 
Ivo Arakov is an actor. He entered the House on Day 1 and was the seventh evicted on Day 57.

Kamelia G. 
Kamelia Gesheva "Voche" is a TV host and singer. She entered the House on Day 1 and was the eighth evicted on Day 59.

Kamelia T. 
Kamelia Todorova is a jazz singer. She entered the House on Day 1 and was the fourth evicted on Day 43.

Konstantin 

Konstantin Papazov "Titi" is a basketball coach. He entered the House on Day 1 and decided to walk out of the House on Day 31.

Martin 
Martin Martinov is a male model and former Mister Bulgaria 2009. He entered the House on Day 1 and was the first evicted on Day 22.

Stefan I. 
Stefan Ivanov "Wosh MC" is a rap singer. He entered the House on Day 3 and finished third in the finale on Day 64.

Stefan M. 
Stefan Manov "Tacho" is the husband of Evgenia Kalkandjieva. He entered the House on Day 1 with his wife Evgenia and was ejected on Day 15 for slapping Zornitsa, his former lover, in the face. He was allowed to re-enter the House on Day 29 in order to show that he changed his behavior toward his wife Evgenia, but not as a full-right Housemate and finished fourth in the finale on Day 64.

Vladislav 
Vladislav Karamfilov "Vladi Vargala" is an actor. He entered the House on Day 3 and became a winner on Day 64.

Yordanka 
Yordanka Hristova is a famous singer. She entered the House on Day 1 and finished second in the finale on Day 64.

Zornitsa 
Zornitsa Lindareva is a model and former lover of Stefan Manov. She entered the House on Day 3 and was the fifth evicted on Day 50.

Houseguests

Lyudmila 
Lyudmila Zahazhaeva is the mother of Albena Vuleva. She is from Saint Petersburg, Russia. She entered the House on Day 31 and left the House on Day 57.

Nominations table

Notes 

 : The Head of Houses were immune without the other housemates knowing, and nominated 3 housemates instead of 2. However, no one was evicted, as it was a fake eviction.
 : This time, the Head of Houses were not immune, as they were the same as last week. However, they nominated 3 housemates like last week. Atanas, Ivo and Zornitsa won immunity as they were fake evicted. Vladislav and Konstantin's nominations were voided because they had a disrespectful behavior towards Big Brother. Eviction was cancelled due to Stefan slapping Zornitsa in the face. He was ejected.
 : Kamelia T. won the challenge and won HoH. Yordanka lost, and was automatically nominated. As HoH, Kamelia T. gave Iva and Konstantin immunity. Each commentor of the show nominated one housemate. Magi nominated Elena, Veneta nominated Martin, Slavena nominated Eleonora and Sasho nominated Martin.
 : There was no HoH this week. Each commentor of the show nominated one housemate. Nikol nominated Evgeni, Magi nominated Eleonora, Veneta nominated Evgeni and Slavena nominated Evgeni. Evgeni was nominated.
 : Kamelia G., Yordanka, Iva, Vladislav and Ivo were initially nominated. The commentors of the show had to save 2 of the nominees. They chose to save Kamelia V. and Yordanka.
 : Elena won the challenge and won HoH. Eleonora lost, and was automatically nominated. As HoH, Elena gave immunity to Ivo and Stefan I. Elena's nomination to Kamelia T. was voided because she didn't gave a reason to nominate her. Albena, Evgenia & Stefan M., Eleonora, Kamelia T. and Kamelia G. were nominated. However, the public voted on Facebook for the last nominee, which was Zornitsa. However, the home board could save one of the nominees, they decided to save Eleonora.
 : Ivo won the challenge and won HoH. Stefan I. lost, and was automatically nominated. As HoH, Ivo gave immunity to Evgenia & Stefan M. and Atanas.
 : During the eighth and final nominations, the housemates had to first vote for who they wanted to win (the name in ) and second for who they didn't want to win (the name in black). 
 : Galina won the challenge and won HoH. No one was automatically nominated this time. In this nominations, housemates had to first vote for who they wanted to win (first name) and second for who they do not wanted to win (second name). They were able to vote for themselves. Albena, Elena, Evgenia & Stefan M., Vladislav, Atanas, Ivo and Kamelia G. were initially nominated. As HoH, Galina could save 2 of the nominees. She saved Evgenia & Stefan M. and Elena.

References

2014 Bulgarian television seasons
VIP Brother seasons
2014 Bulgarian television series endings